Michał Osiński (born September 5, 1978 in Łódź) is a Polish football player.

External links
 

1978 births
Living people
Polish footballers
ŁKS Łódź players
Siarka Tarnobrzeg players
RKS Radomsko players
Ruch Chorzów players
Podbeskidzie Bielsko-Biała players
Footballers from Łódź
Association football defenders